Cunina is a genus of hydrozoan in the Cuninidae. The genus contains bioluminescent species.

Species
The following species are recognized:

Cunina becki Bouillon, 1985
Cunina discoides Fewkes, 1881
Cunina duplicata Maas, 1893
Cunina fowleri (Browne, 1906)
Cunina frugifera Kramp, 1948
Cunina globosa Eschscholtz, 1829
Cunina octonaria McCrady, 1857
Cunina peregrina Bigelow, 1909
Cunina proboscidea E. & L. Metschnikoff, 1871
Cunina simplex Gili, Bouillon, Pagès, Palanques, Puig & Heussner, 1998
Cunina tenella (Bigelow, 1909)

References

Cuninidae
Hydrozoan genera
Bioluminescent cnidarians